The Book of Pleasure (Self-Love): Psychology of Ecstasy is a book written by Austin Osman Spare during 1909–1913 and self-published in 1913.

The book could be regarded as the central text among his writings. It covers both mystical and magical aspects of Spare's ideas; as the modern ideas on sigils (as now have become popular in chaos magic) and Spare's special theory on incarnation are for the first time introduced in this book.

There are some chapters in The Book of Pleasure that Spare has referred to within the text, but are omitted. It seems that they were destroyed during World War II.

The book had originally been planned as a mutus liber of illustrations only – "the Wisdom without words", but was expanded later.

The book has been reissued several times:
 Quebec: 93 Publishing, 1975.
 Northampton: Sut Anubis, 1987 (facsimile).

References

1913 books
Occult books
Self-published books